Pim van Vliet (born 30 September 1977) is a Dutch fund manager and head of conservative equities at Robeco.

Education 
Pim van Vliet holds a PhD in finance and a Master's in Economics (cum laude) from Erasmus University Rotterdam. He has a history degree and successfully completed a dissertation on Downside Risk and Empirical Asset Pricing in 2004.

Career 
In 2005 he left academia and joined Robeco and began developing and managing quantitative strategies as a quantitative fund manager. He has founded the Conservative Equity strategies in 2006 and is head of the quantitative equity department within Robeco. He has written 35 research papers on quantitative investing in general and low-volatility investing in particular. In 2016 he wrote the investment book "High returns from Low risk" which explains low-volatility investing in an easy way. The book is available in six languages and sold more than 10,000 copies. He has appeared in several podcasts and webinars on investments.  He is quoted as a fund manager in the Financial Times, Reuters, and Institutional Investor. His historical research on quantitative investing going back 100+ years was featured in two Bloomberg articles in 2019 and the Washington Post in 2022. His factor investing articles have appeared in peer-reviewed academic journals, such as the Journal of Financial Economics, Financial Analyst Journal, Management Science, Journal of Banking and Finance, and Journal of Portfolio Management

Selected publications 
Pim has written an investment book and many academic papers, with significant contributions to the low-volatility anomaly. His co-authors include Guido Baltussen, David Blitz, Eric Falkenstein, Haim Levy, and others. His papers have been downloaded 100,000+ times on the Social Science Research Network (SSRN).  As of 2023 his h-index is 11 (Scopus) and 20 (Scholar). His most popular publications are:

 Global Factor Premiums, Journal of Financial Economics, 2021.
 When Equity Factors Drop Their Shorts, Financial Analyst Journal, 2020.
 The Conservative Formula: Quantitative Investing made easy, Journal of Portfolio Management, 2018.
 The Volatility Effect: Lower Risk without Lower Returns, Journal of Portfolio Management, 2007.
 Risk aversion and skewness preference, Journal of Banking and Finance, 2008.

Investment book 
High Returns from Low Risk: a remarkable stock market paradox,   Wiley Publishers, 2016.

 The book, written with Jan de Koning, is translated into Chinese, German, French, Spanish and Dutch. 
 In 2017 the book was must read number #1 on finance-monthly.com  and has received many reviews from the US, Europe and China in the following years. It is reviewed on ETF.com, FT advisors, Trader Life UK, Stockopedia, El Mundo Financiero Beleggers belangen FocusMoney and Masterbourse and JD.com.
 The Conservative Formula is introduced in this book.

Awards 
 Citation of Excellence Award Issued by Emerald for paper "The Volatility Effect: Lower Risk without Lower Returns" in Journal of Portfolio Management.
 The team managing the Emerging Conservative Equities fund receives a 'golden' mutual fund prize from the readers of Fiscalert, a financial magazine, in 2016.

Personal life 
Pim lives in Berkel en Rodenrijs, The Netherlands. In the investment book he describes that his father, an entrepreneur, taught him the virtues of saving and investing at a young age.

See also 
 Low-volatility investing
 Conservative formula investing
 Momentum investing
 Factor investing

References 

1977 births
Living people
Financial economists
Dutch economists
Dutch investors
Erasmus University Rotterdam alumni
Econometricians
Dutch hedge fund managers